Syma is a genus of tree kingfishers in the family Alcedinidae that are resident in New Guinea and northeast Australia.

The genus was introduced by the French surgeon and naturalist René Lesson in 1827. Syma was the name of a sea nymph in Greek mythology.

The genus contains two species:

The adults of both species have bright yellow bills. The mountain kingfisher is endemic to the mountainous regions of New Guinea. The yellow-billed kingfisher occurs in lowland areas of New Guinea and on the Cape York Peninsula in north eastern Australia.

References

 
Bird genera
 
Taxa named by René Lesson
Taxonomy articles created by Polbot